Boys' Bowl, is a yearly high school match between Detroit Catholic Central High School Shamrocks and another Catholic school under the Archdiocese of Detroit.  It is usually the most hyped football event for Catholic Central, if not necessarily the most important, and referred to as the "Homecoming" for the Varsity football team.  CC also has its annual Boys Bowl mass, breakfast, and Athletic Hall of Fame induction ceremony that weekend as well, which is hosted by the CC Alumni Association Committees.

History
Boys' Bowl began October 22, 1944. Alex Chesney coached the Shamrocks that year, and CC was considered the best football team in the state.  Father James Martin, CSB, Athletic Director of CC at that time, came up with an idea of having the best team in Michigan play against the best team in America, Boys Town, Nebraska, and met with Edward J. Flanagan of Boys' Town.  The game was played at Briggs Stadium. Boys Town, whose coach had gone undefeated for an indefinite amount of time, came in wearing blue.  CC donned, contrary to the usual royal blue and white, jerseys of blue and gold.  That game resulted in a tie between the two teams, but it started a long-standing tradition which would last from that time to the present day Boys Bowl.

Due to rising costs of moving a team across the country, the games soon ended, but have now since been replaced with CC games against De La Salle Collegiate High School, Brother Rice High School, U of D Jesuit (2011) and many other Catholic schools under the archdiocese of Detroit.

It continues to be one of Michigan's most anticipated and highest attended high school athletic events every year.

Boys' Bowl Posters
Traditionally, Juniors and Seniors in Catholic Central paint large banner posters to be hung over the walls and ceiling, usually containing "Go Shamrocks!" banners or inside jokes about the school.  Banners are also painted for the Catholic Central - Brother Rice game.   Catholic Central leads the all-time series 34-30-1 as of 2020.

Recent Boys' Bowls
As a tradition, the CC band performs a special half-time show for Boys' Bowl.  This special show includes the premiere of the Drumline's Drum Feature to the public. The Drum feature premiers to students during the annual boys bowl assembly that is held during school the Friday before the game.

In 2007, the CC Band performed 007 James Bond songs since the year was 2007.  Also, during the playing of the National Anthem during pre-game, a U.S. Marine two jet fly-by was approved over the field; the first time ever that a U.S. Marine fly-by has taken place over a high school game.  The Catholic Central Shamrocks defeated the Orchard Lake St. Mary Eaglets by a score of 21–10.  In 2007, Orchard Lake St. Mary's was ranked highly in Michigan, increasing the impact of this win.

American football competitions
Roman Catholic Archdiocese of Detroit